Khaled Fadhel (born September 29, 1976 in Tunis) is a Tunisian football former player and goalkeeper. He played for Kayseri Erciyesspor in Turkey.

Fadhel was a member of the Tunisian 2004 Olympic football squad, which exited in the first round. The team finished third in group C, behind group and gold medal winners Argentina and runners-up Australia. He was part of the squad that won the 2004 African Cup of Nations.

Fadhel transferred from Diyarbakırspor in 2006.

Honours
Tunisia
 Africa Cup of Nations: 2004

References

 
 

1976 births
Living people
Footballers at the 2004 Summer Olympics
Olympic footballers of Tunisia
2004 African Cup of Nations players
2005 FIFA Confederations Cup players
2006 Africa Cup of Nations players
Tunisia international footballers
Tunisian footballers
Tunisian expatriate footballers
Expatriate footballers in Turkey
Diyarbakırspor footballers
Kayseri Erciyesspor footballers
Association football goalkeepers
Footballers from Tunis
Club Africain players
US Monastir (football) players